Isaac Jackman (fl. 1795) was an Irish journalist and dramatist.

Life
Born around the middle of the 18th century in Dublin, Jackman practised as an attorney there. He ultimately moved to London and wrote for the stage. He seems to be one of the pair young Irishmen who edited The Morning Post for a few years between 1786 and 1795, and involved the printer and proprietor in several libel cases.

Works

Jackman's Milesian, a comic opera, on its production at Drury Lane on 20 March 1777, met with an indifferent reception. It was published in 1777. All the World's a Stage, a farce by Jackman in two acts, in prose, was first performed at Drury Lane, on 7 April 1777, and was frequently revived. It was printed in 1777, and reprinted in John Bell's British Theatre and other collections. 

The Divorce, a farce, was produced at Drury Lane, opening on 10 November 1781. It was well received and later twice revived; it was printed in 1781. Hero and Leander, a burletta by Jackman (in two acts, prose and verse), was produced at the Royalty Theatre, Goodman's Fields, in 1787. Jackman prefixed a long dedication to Phillips Glover of Wispington, Lincolnshire, in the form of a letter on "Royal and Royalty Theatres": it purported to prove the illegality of the opposition of the existing theatres to one just opened by John Palmer in Wellclose Square, Tower Hamlets.

Notes

Attribution

Year of birth missing
Year of death missing
18th-century Irish writers
Irish journalists
Irish dramatists and playwrights
Irish male dramatists and playwrights
18th-century Irish lawyers